Bahāʾ al-Dīn Abū al-Maḥāsin Yūsuf ibn Rāfiʿ ibn Tamīm (the honorific title "Bahā' ad-Dīn" means "splendor of the faith"; sometimes known as Bohadin or Boha-Eddyn) (6 March 1145 – 8 November 1234) was a 12th-century Kurdish jurist, scholar and historian notable for writing a biography of Saladin whom he knew well.

Life

Ibn Shaddād was born in Mosul on 10 Ramadan 539 AH (6 March 1145 CE), where he studied the Qur'an, hadith, and Muslim law before moving to the Nizamiyya madrasa in Baghdad where he rapidly became mu'id ("assistant professor"). At an early age, Ibn Shaddad lost his father and he was raised by his maternal uncles the Banu Shaddad, from whom he got his name 'Ibn Shaddad'. About 1173, he returned to Mosul as mudarris ("professor"). In 1188, returning from Hajj, ibn Shaddād was summoned by Saladin who had read and been impressed by his writings. He was "permanently enrolled" in the service of Saladin, who appointed him qadi al-'askar ("judge of the army"). 
In this capacity, he was an eyewitness at the Siege of Acre and the Battle of Arsuf and provided "a vivid chronicle of the Third Crusade". 
Saladin and ibn Shaddād soon became close friends and the sultan appointed him to several high administrative and judicial offices. 
Ibn Shaddād remained an intimate and trusted friend of Saladin, "seldom absent for any length of time", as well as one of his main advisers, for the rest of the sultan's life. 
After Saladin's death, ibn Shaddād was appointed qadi ("judge") of Aleppo. He died there on 14 Safar 632 AH (8 November 1234), aged 89 years.

Works
Ibn Shaddād's best-known work is his biography of Saladin, which is "based for the most part on personal observation" and provides a complete portrait as "Muslims saw him". 
Published in English as The Rare and Excellent History of Saladin, the Arab title (al-Nawādir al-Sultaniyya wa'l-Maḥāsin al-Yūsufiyya) translates as "Sultanic Anecdotes and Josephly Virtues". The text has survived intact and is still in print. 
Ibn Shaddād also wrote several works on the practical application of Islamic law, The Refuge of Judges from the Ambiguity of Judgements, The Proofs of Judgments and The Epitome as well as a monograph entitled The Virtues of the Jihad. Much of the information known about Ibn Shaddād derives from Ibn Khallikan's contemporary Biographical Dictionary (Wafāyāt al-a'yān, literally "Obituaries of Eminent Men").

Notes

References

External links
 Baha ad-Din ibn Shaddad (1896): The Life of Saladin (The library of the Palestine Pilgrims' Text Society)
Albert Schultens, 1755: Sīrat al-Sulṭān al-Malik al-Nāṣir Ṣalāḥ al-Dīn Abī Muẓaffar Yūsuf ibn Ayyūb ...  (in Latin and Arabic)
 Bohadin at The General biographical dictionary (London 1812), p. 519.
 François-Xavier Feller, Dictionnaire historique, p. 364.

Muslims of the Third Crusade
Medieval writers about the Crusades
1145 births
1234 deaths
Writers from Mosul
Historians from the Ayyubid Sultanate
Saladin
13th-century historians of the medieval Islamic world